The list includes Issei (一世, "first generation") Japanese-born immigrants from Japan, and those who are multigenerational Japanese Americans. Cities considered to have significant Japanese American populations are large U.S. cities or municipalities with a critical mass of at least 1.0% of the total urban population; medium-sized cities with a critical mass of at least 2.0% of the total population; smaller communities in the continental United States with a critical mass of at least 2.5% of the total population; and smaller communities in Hawaii with a critical mass of at least 10.0% of the total population.

There are about 773,714 Japanese Americans, as of 2018. 

The two metropolitan areas with the highest Japanese populations according to the 2010 Census, were Greater Honolulu Combined Statistical Area (149,700), and the Greater Los Angeles Combined Statistical Area (134,600).

Large cities
The list of large cities (population greater than 250,000) with a Japanese American population in excess of 1.0% of the total population.

Medium-size cities
List of medium-sized cities (population between 100,000 and 250,000) with a Japanese American population of at least 2.0% of the total population.

Smaller communities in the continental United States
List of places in the continental United States with a population fewer than 100,000 and a Japanese American population of at least 2.5% of the total population.

Smaller communities in Hawaii
List of places in Hawaii with a population fewer than 100,000 and a Japanese American population of at least 10.0% of the total population.

References

Japanese American
+
Japanese-American history
Japanese